Leo Strunin was president of the Royal College of Anaesthetists from 1997 to 2000.

See also
History of anesthesiology

References

Presidents of the Royal College of Anaesthetists
British anaesthetists
Living people
Year of birth missing (living people)
Place of birth missing (living people)
Presidents of the Association of Anaesthetists